Robert Seymour Bridges  (23 October 1844 – 21 April 1930) was an English poet who was Poet Laureate from 1913 to 1930. A doctor by training, he achieved literary fame only late in life. His poems reflect a deep Christian faith, and he is the author of many well-known hymns. It was through Bridges's efforts that Gerard Manley Hopkins achieved posthumous fame.

Personal and professional life
Bridges was born at Walmer, Kent, in England, the son of John Thomas Bridges (died 1853) and his wife Harriett Elizabeth, daughter of the Rev. Sir Robert Affleck, 4th Baronet. He was the fourth son and eighth child. After his father's death his mother married again, in 1854, to John Edward Nassau Molesworth, vicar of Rochdale, and the family moved there.

Bridges was educated at Eton College and Corpus Christi College, Oxford. He went on to study medicine in London at St Bartholomew's Hospital, intending to practise until the age of forty and then retire to write poetry. He practised as a casualty physician at his teaching hospital (where he made a series of highly critical remarks about the Victorian medical establishment) and subsequently as a full physician to the Great  Northern Central Hospital (1876-85)(later the Royal Northern Hospital). He was also a physician to the Hospital for Sick Children.

Lung disease forced Bridges to retire from his post as physician in 1885, and from that point on he devoted himself to writing and literary research. However, Bridges's literary work started long before his retirement, his first collection of poems having been published in 1873. In 1884 he married Mary Monica Waterhouse, daughter of the architect Alfred Waterhouse R.A., and spent the rest of his life in rural seclusion, first at Yattendon, then at Boars Hill, Berkshire (close to Oxford), where he died.

He was elected to the Fellowship of the Royal College of Physicians of London in 1900. He was appointed Poet Laureate in 1913, the only medical graduate to have held the office.

He was the father of poet Elizabeth Daryush and of the cabinet secretary Edward Bridges.

Literary work
As a poet Bridges stands rather apart from the current of modern English verse, but his work has had great influence in a select circle, by its restraint, purity, precision and delicacy yet strength of expression. It embodies a distinct theory of prosody. Bridges's faith underpinned much of his work.

In the book Milton's Prosody, he took an empirical approach to examining Milton's use of blank verse, and developed the controversial theory that Milton's practice was essentially syllabic. He considered free verse to be too limiting, and explained his position in the essay "Humdrum and Harum-Scarum". His own efforts to "free" verse resulted in the poems he called "Neo-Miltonic Syllabics", which were collected in New Verse (1925). The metre of these poems was based on syllables rather than accents, and he used the principle again in the long philosophical poem The Testament of Beauty (1929), for which he was appointed to the Order of Merit in that year. His best-known poems, however, are to be found in the two earlier volumes of Shorter Poems (1890, 1894). He also wrote verse plays, with limited success, and literary criticism, including a study of the work of John Keats.

Bridges's poetry was privately printed in the first instance, and was slow in making its way beyond a comparatively small circle of his admirers. His best work is to be found in his Shorter Poems (1890), and a complete edition (to date) of his Poetical Works (6 vols.) was published in 1898–1905.

Despite being made poet laureate in 1913, Bridges was never a very well-known poet and only achieved his great popularity shortly before his death with The Testament of Beauty. However, his verse evoked response in many great British composers of the time. Among those to set his poems to music were Hubert Parry, Gustav Holst and later Gerald Finzi.

During the First World War, Bridges joined the group of writers assembled by Charles Masterman as part of Britain's War Propaganda Bureau at Wellington House.

At Oxford, Bridges befriended Gerard Manley Hopkins, who is now considered a superior poet but who owes his present fame to Bridges's efforts in arranging the posthumous publication (1918) of his verse.

Bridges received advice from the young phonetician David Abercrombie on the reformed spelling system he was devising for the publication of his collected essays (later published in seven volumes by Oxford University Press, with the help of the distinguished typographer Stanley Morison, who designed the new letters). Thus Robert Bridges contributed to phonetics and he was also a founder member of the Society for Pure English.

Hymnody
Bridges made an important contribution to hymnody with the publication in 1899 of his Yattendon Hymnal, which he created specifically for musical reasons. This collection of hymns, although not a financial success, became a bridge between the Victorian hymnody of the last half of the 19th century and the modern hymnody of the early 20th century.
 
Bridges wrote and also translated historic hymns, and many of these were included in Songs of Syon (1904) and the later English Hymnal (1906). Several of Bridges's hymns and translations are still in use today:

"Thee will I love, my God and King"
"Happy are they that love God"
"Rejoice, O land, in God thy might"
The Baptist Hymn Book, University Press, Oxford 1962
"Ah, Holy Jesus" (Johann Heermann, 1630)
"All my hope on God is founded" (Joachim Neander, c. 1680)
"Jesu, Joy of Man's Desiring" (Martin Jahn, 1661)
"O Gladsome Light" (Phos Hilaron)
"O Sacred Head, sore wounded" (Paulus Gerhardt, 1656)
"O Splendour of God's Glory Bright" (Ambrose, 4th century)
"When morning gilds the skies" (stanza 3; Katholisches Gesangbuch, 1744)

Phonetic alphabet 

Robert Bridges developed his own phonetic alphabet for English, with the help of the phonetician David Abercrombie. Bridges, and later his wife, published some volumes of his Collected Essays, Papers, &tc. in the alphabet, with characters by Stanley Morison of the Monotype Corporation.

Major works
Dates given are of first publication and significant revisions.

Poetry collections
The Growth of Love (1876; 1889; 1898), a sequence of (24; 79; 69) sonnets
Prometheus the Firegiver: A Mask in the Greek Manner (1883)
Eros and Psyche: A Narrative Poem in Twelve Measures (1885; 1894), a story from the Latin of Apuleius
Shorter Poems, Books I–IV (1890)
Shorter Poems, Books I–V (1894)
New Poems (1899)
Demeter: A Mask (1905), performed in 1904 at the opening of the Somerville College Library
Ibant Obscuri: An Experiment in the Classical Hexameter (1916), with reprint of summary of Stone's Prosody, accompanied by 'later observations & modifications'
October and Other Poems (1920)
The Tapestry: Poems (1925), in neo-Miltonic syllabics
New Verse (1926), includes verse of The Tapestry
The Testament of Beauty (1929)

Verse drama
Nero (1885), an historical tragedy; called The First Part of Nero subsequent to the publication of Nero: Part II
The Feast of Bacchus (1889); partly translated from the Heauton-Timoroumenos of Terence
Achilles in Scyros (1890), a drama in a mixed manner
Palicio (1890), a romantic drama in five acts in the Elizabethan manner
The Return of Ulysses (1890), a drama in five acts in a mixed manner
The Christian Captives (1890), a tragedy in five acts in a mixed manner; on the same subject as Calderón's El Principe Constante
The Humours of the Court (1893), a comedy in three acts; founded on Calderón's El secreto á voces and on Lope de Vega's El Perro del hortelano
Nero, Part II (1894)

Prose
Milton's Prosody, With a Chapter on Accentual Verse (1893; 1901; 1921), based on essays published in 1887 and 1889
Keats (1895)
Hymns from the Yattendon Hymnal (1899)
The Spirit of Man (1916)
Poems of Gerard Manley Hopkins (1918), edited with notes by R.B.
The Necessity of Poetry (1918)
Collected Essays, Papers, Etc. (1927–36)

See also
Robert Bridges's theory of elision
Bridges's analysis of Milton's later work

Notes

References
 Bridges, Robert: The Poetical Works of Robert Bridges, Oxford Editions of Standard Authors, Oxford University Press, 2nd edition, 1936. (reissued 1953 with The Testament of Beauty)
 Guérard, Albert, Jr.: Robert Bridges: A Study of Traditionalism in Poetry, Harvard University Press, 1942.
 Phillips, Catherine: Robert Bridges: A Biography, Oxford University Press, 1992.  
 Stanford, Donald E.: In the Classic Mode: The Achievement of Robert Bridges, Associated University Presses, 1978.

External links

 
 
 
 Robert Bridges's Grave

1844 births
1930 deaths
English Anglicans
British Poets Laureate
People from Walmer
Alumni of Corpus Christi College, Oxford
Alumni of the Medical College of St Bartholomew's Hospital
19th-century English writers
Victorian poets
20th-century English poets
People from Yattendon
People educated at Eton College